Sir Robert Evan Owen Williams FRCP FRCPath FFPHM (30 June 1916 – 24 May 2003) was a Welsh pathologist.

References 

1916 births
2003 deaths
Welsh pathologists
Knights Bachelor
Fellows of the Royal College of Physicians